Tarumappu Dam  is an earthfill dam located in Hokkaido Prefecture in Japan. The dam is used for flood control. The catchment area of the dam is 11.6 km2. The dam impounds about 20  ha of land when full and can store 1130 thousand cubic meters of water. The construction of the dam was started on 1972 and completed in 2000.

References

Dams in Hokkaido